Kissed by Nature is the fifteenth studio album by Brazilian jazz pianist Eliane Elias. The album was released on September 24, 2002 via RCA/Bluebird label.

Reception
Alex Henderson of Allmusic wrote "Kissed by Nature" is her first RCA release. For the most part, this is a vocal album, although Elias does get in some likable solos—and this time, she emphasizes relaxed, laid-back Brazilian pop-jazz. Kissed by Nature is essentially Brazilian easy listening, although it isn't bloodless elevator Muzak; even at her most commercial, Elias probably has too much substance and integrity for the average smooth jazz/NAC station. One thing she doesn't have is a great voice. While Elias is an excellent pianist, her voice is undeniably thin—as a vocalist, she doesn't have a fantastic range by any means. But despite Elias' obvious limitations as a singer, her vocals (some in English, some in Portuguese, and some wordless) are pleasant enough on caressing pop-jazz originals like "A Volta," "Balancê," and the title track."

Dour Ramsey of JazzTimes stated "Pianist Eliane Elias’ easy Brazilian atmospherics on much of Kissed by Nature resemble Gary McFarland’s pop-jazz successes of the 1960s, Soft Samba and The In Sound. The title piece, with English lyrics and a vocal by Elias, sets the comfortable tone. Many of the tracks have an overdubbed choir of Eliases singing in Portuguese. All of them feature her excellent piano work, supported by bassist Marc Johnson, with drummers Joey Baron and Paulo Braga alternating."

Track list
Kissed by Nature – 5:29
A Volta – 5:49
Manhattan – 4:19
Apareceu – 5:21
Pererê – 4:50
Where Did You Go – 4:34
Balancê – 4:56
Djavan Medley (Fato Consumado/Dobrado) – 5:27
October – 5:32
September – 4:34
Luar – 4:27
Kissed by Nature (Remix, Bossacucanova) – 4:42
Balancê (Remix Bossacucanova) – 4:48

Personnel
 Eliane Elias – piano, vocals
 Randy Brecker – trumpet, flugelhorn
 Rick Margitza – tenor saxophone
 Paulo André Tavares – guitar
 Marc Johnson – bass guitar
 Joey Baron – drums
 Paulo Braga – drums

References

External links

2002 albums
Eliane Elias albums